Evandro Goebel (born 23 August 1986), known as Evandro, is a Brazilian former footballer who played as an attacking midfielder. He also held Serbian citizenship.

Over seven seasons, he amassed Série A totals of 144 matches and 12 goals, representing six clubs. He also competed professionally in Serbia, Portugal and England.

Club career

Atlético Paranaense
Born in Blumenau, Santa Catarina, Evandro made his professional debut for Atlético Paranaense against Malutrom, in a 3–1 win for the Campeonato Paranaense on 10 February 2005. He scored his first goal on 1 June, helping to a 3–2 victory over Santos in the Copa Libertadores.

During his five-year tenure at the Arena da Baixada, Evandro was also loaned to Goiás, Palmeiras and Atlético Mineiro. On 25 May 2010, still owned by Atlético, he signed alongside teammate Renan Oliveira with Vitória, in exchange for Neto Berola.

Red Star

Evandro joined Serbian club Red Star Belgrade on 1 December 2010, on a three-and-a-half-year contract. In order to reduce the number of foreigners in the squad, a Serbian passport was requested for him, and the following July the Serbian government approved the move and he officially became a national of the country.

On 16 May 2012, Evandro scored the opening goal in the final of the Serbian Cup, a 2–0 defeat of FK Borac Čačak. On 22 August, however, he terminated his contract immediately prior to the second leg of the UEFA Europa League's play-off round against FC Girondins de Bordeaux, saying to a journalist at Belgrade's airport: "I can't play for Red Star any more. I train, I play games, and there is no money. I can't do it any longer, I have to think about my family. I am not mad at anyone. I loved Belgrade and Serbia. I played the best I could, I don't think Red Star was a mistake."

Estoril
Evandro moved to Portugal with G.D. Estoril Praia in the summer of 2012. He made his Primeira Liga debut on 29 September, coming on as a late substitute in a 2–2 draw at Sporting CP.

On 27 January 2013, Evandro's successful strike during a 3–3 home draw to S.C. Olhanense received widespread media coverage. He finished his second season with a career-best 11 goals, as his team finished fourth and qualified to the Europa League.

Porto

Evandro signed with FC Porto for the 2014–15 campaign. He appeared in 33 competitive matches in his first year, but only four in the first half of 2016–17 after the arrival of new manager Nuno Espírito Santo.

Hull City
On 13 January 2017, Evandro signed a -year deal with Hull City. He made his Premier League debut the following day, replacing Robert Snodgrass for the last 14 minutes of a 3–1 home win against AFC Bournemouth. He scored his first goal for his new team on 29 January, but in a 1–4 away loss to Fulham in the fourth round of the FA Cup.

Evandro left the KCOM Stadium at the end of the 2018–19 season.

Santos
On 1 July 2019, Evandro returned to Brazil after nearly nine years, and agreed to a one-year contract at Santos. He made his debut for the club on 4 August, replacing Felipe Jonatan in a 6–1 home rout of former side Goiás.

Evandro scored his first goal for Peixe on 1 December 2019, the second of a 2–0 home defeat of Chapecoensel. The following 9 June, after falling down the pecking order under new manager Jesualdo Ferreira, it was announced that his contract would not be renewed.

Chapecoense
On 11 September 2020, Evandro was announced at Campeonato Brasileiro Série B's Chapecoense. On 26 February 2021, shortly after winning the league (a first-ever national honour for the club), he announced his retirement.

International career
Evandro was part of the Brazil under-20 team at the 2005 FIFA World Youth Championship held in the Netherlands, contributing six scoreless appearances for the eventual third-placed nation.

Personal life
Evandro's father, Osmair, was also a footballer.

Career statistics

Honours

Club
Atlético Paranaense
Campeonato Paranaense: 2005

Red Star Belgrade
Serbian Cup: 2011–12

Chapecoense
Campeonato Brasileiro Série B: 2020

International
Brazil U20
FIFA World Youth Championship third place: 2005

Individual
Serbian SuperLiga Team of the Year: 2010–11

References

External links

Furacão profile 
Stats at Utakmica  

1986 births
Living people
People from Blumenau
Brazilian people of German descent
Serbian people of Brazilian descent
Serbian people of German descent
Naturalized citizens of Serbia
Brazilian footballers
Association football midfielders
Campeonato Brasileiro Série A players
Campeonato Brasileiro Série B players
Club Athletico Paranaense players
Goiás Esporte Clube players
Sociedade Esportiva Palmeiras players
Clube Atlético Mineiro players
Esporte Clube Vitória players
Santos FC players
Associação Chapecoense de Futebol players
Serbian SuperLiga players
Red Star Belgrade footballers
Primeira Liga players
G.D. Estoril Praia players
FC Porto players
Premier League players
English Football League players
Hull City A.F.C. players
Brazil under-20 international footballers
Brazilian expatriate footballers
Expatriate footballers in Serbia
Expatriate footballers in Portugal
Expatriate footballers in England
Brazilian expatriate sportspeople in Serbia
Brazilian expatriate sportspeople in Portugal
Brazilian expatriate sportspeople in England
Sportspeople from Santa Catarina (state)